Pegoplata, sometimes known as Nupedia, is a genus of flies within the family Anthomyiidae.

Species

P. abnormis (Stein, 1920)
P. acutipennis (Malloch, 1918)
P. aestiva (Meigen, 1826)
P. anabnormis (Huckett, 1939)
P. arnaudi Griffiths, 1986
P. californica Griffiths, 1986
P. cuticornis (Huckett, 1939)
P. dasiomma (Fan, 1982)
P. debilis (Stein, 1916)
P. durangensis Griffiths, 1986
P. fulva Malloch, 1934
P. huachucensis Griffiths, 1986
P. infirma (Meigen, 1826)
P. infuscata Griffiths, 1986
P. juvenilis (Stein, 1898)
P. laotudingga Zheng & Xue, 2002
P. lengshanensis Xue, 2001
P. linotaenia Ma, 1988
P. nasuta Griffiths, 1986
P. nevadensis Griffiths, 1986
P. nigracaerulea (Snyder, 1952)
P. nigroscutellata (Stein, 1920)
P. palposa (Stein, 1897)
P. patellans (Pandellé, 1900)
P. peninsularis Griffiths, 1986
P. pictipes (Bigot, 1885)
P. setulosa Griffiths, 1986
P. tundrica (Schnabl, 1915)
P. valentinae (Ackland, 1971)
P. wyomingensis Griffiths, 1986

References

 
DELY-DRASKOVIT, Á., 1993. Family Anthomyiidae. In Soós, Á. & Papp, L. (eds): Catalogue of Palaearctic Diptera, Vol. 13, pp. 90–92. Akadémiai Kiadó, Budapest.

Anthomyiidae
Muscoidea genera